Garnett is a rail station in Atlanta, Georgia, on the Red and Gold lines of the Metropolitan Atlanta Rapid Transit Authority (MARTA) rail system. It has an island platform between two tracks with the north end of the platform facing a tunnel portal that leads to the Five Points station and other downtown Atlanta underground stations. This station has three levels. It was opened on December 4, 1981. The upper level has an entrance from the street and a mezzanine that is about 3/4 the length of the platform below.  The lower level of the station is another entrance from another street and there is a Greyhound Bus Terminal next to the station. This station mainly serves South Downtown, Castleberry Hill, is a main gateway to tourists visiting Atlanta by Greyhound. and it provides access to the Municipal Court of Atlanta, Atlanta City Hall,  Atlanta Public Schools,  Castleberry Hill, The Grady Detention Center, and the main Greyhound Bus Terminal.

Station layout

Other Transit Connections
Greyhound Bus Lines
Southeastern Bus Line

References

External links 
MARTA Station Page
 Station from Google Maps Street View

Gold Line (MARTA)
Red Line (MARTA)
Metropolitan Atlanta Rapid Transit Authority stations
Railway stations in the United States opened in 1981
Railway stations in Atlanta
1981 establishments in Georgia (U.S. state)